José Horacio Basualdo (born 20 June 1963) is an Argentine football manager and former player who played as a midfielder.

Club career
Basualdo won several Argentine and international titles with both Vélez Sársfield and Boca Juniors.

International career
Basualdo played 31 matches for the Argentina national team between 1989 and 1995 and played for the Argentina national football team in the 1990 and 1994 World Cups.

At the 1990 FIFA World Cup, in the Round of 16 match against Brazil, Basualdo broke clean through on goal, only to be hacked down by Brazil's captain Ricardo Gomes, who was duly sent off.

Coaching career
After retiring as a player, he worked as the coach of Peruvian teams Universitario de Deportes, Cienciano, Deportivo Quito, El Porvenir, Santiago Morning and Universidad de Chile, Real Mataram.

In 2006, he had a brief spell at Club El Porvenir, in Argentina, where he was relegated after drawing one match and losing six. During his brief stay at the Gerli club, Basualdo was the protagonist of an event that would generate the total repudiation of the fans. During matchday 5 of the 2006 Clausura Tournament, his team was supposed to visit Huracán in Parque de los Patricios, but instead of being on the substitutes' bench guiding his team, Basualdo went to Brazil to play Showbol, which for many was seen as a lack of commitment to the club from the South.

Honours

Player
Vélez Sársfield
Argentine Primera División: 1993 Clausura tournament, 1995 Apertura tournament
Copa Libertadores: 1994
Intercontinental Cup: 1994

Boca Juniors
Argentine Primera División: 1998 Clausura tournament, 1999 Clausura tournament, 2000 Apertura tournament
Copa Libertadores: 2000
Intercontinental Cup: 2000

Argentina
Copa América: 1993
FIFA World Cup runner-up: 1990

References

External links
 
 Futbol Factory profile (Archived) 
 Boca Juniors stats at Historiadeboca.com.ar 

1963 births
Living people
People from Campana, Buenos Aires
Sportspeople from Buenos Aires Province
Deportivo Mandiyú footballers
Bayer 04 Leverkusen players
Boca Juniors footballers
Club Atlético Vélez Sarsfield footballers
Association football defenders
Argentine footballers
Argentine people of Spanish descent
La Liga players
CF Extremadura footballers
Real Jaén footballers
1990 FIFA World Cup players
1994 FIFA World Cup players
1989 Copa América players
1993 Copa América players
Bundesliga players
Expatriate footballers in West Germany
Expatriate footballers in Indonesia
Expatriate footballers in Spain
Argentina international footballers
Argentine football managers
Club Universitario de Deportes managers
S.D. Quito managers
Cienciano managers
Expatriate football managers in Chile
Argentine Primera División players
Argentine expatriate footballers
Argentine expatriate sportspeople in West Germany
Argentine expatriate sportspeople in Spain
José Gálvez FBC managers
Copa América-winning players
Copa Libertadores-winning players
Oriente Petrolero managers
Academia Puerto Cabello managers
C.A. Cerro managers
Deportivo Capiatá managers